In algebraic geometry and synthetic differential geometry, a Grothendieck connection is a way of viewing connections in terms of descent data from infinitesimal neighbourhoods of the diagonal.

Introduction and motivation
The Grothendieck connection is a generalization of the Gauss–Manin connection constructed in a manner analogous to that in which the Ehresmann connection generalizes the Koszul connection.  The construction itself must satisfy a requirement of geometric invariance, which may be regarded as the analog of covariance for a wider class of structures including the schemes of algebraic geometry.  Thus the connection in a certain sense must live in a natural sheaf on a Grothendieck topology.  In this section, we discuss how to describe an Ehresmann connection in sheaf-theoretic terms as a Grothendieck connection.

Much of the infinitesimal geometry of  can be realized in terms of   For instance,  is the sheaf of sections of the cotangent bundle.

A Grothendieck connection is a specified isomorphism between these two spaces. One may proceed to define curvature and p-curvature of a connection in the same language.

See also

References

 Osserman, B., "Connections, curvature, and p-curvature", preprint. 
 Katz, N., "Nilpotent connections and the monodromy theorem", IHES Publ. Math. 39 (1970) 175–232. 

Connection (mathematics)
Algebraic geometry